Kooyong Stadium, at the Kooyong Lawn Tennis Club, is an Australian tennis venue, located in the Melbourne suburb of Kooyong. The stadium, was built in 1927, and has undergone several renovations. 

It has a seating capacity of slightly more than 5,000. At its peak the stadium was capable of hosting up to 15,000 patrons.

History
Kooyong was the venue for the Australian Open, whenever that tournament was held in Melbourne, becoming the permanent venue from 1972 to 1987. It was the last Australian Open venue to play on grass courts. 

The tournament was moved to the hard courts of Melbourne Park in 1988. Now a hard-court surface, it remains the venue for the Kooyong Classic exhibition tournament.

Kooyong has also hosted several Davis Cup ties and finals, including the 1986 Davis Cup Final which saw Australia defeat two-time defending champions Sweden 3–2 in late December. The stadium hosted a tie for the 2016 Davis Cup against the USA in March 2016 on a portable grass court. 

In 2019 the club demolished the upper western and southern stands, revising the seating capacity to approximately 5,000. The venue had previously been capable of seating 8,500 spectators.

Concerts
The venue has also hosted several concerts:

On 24 October 1971 Elton John performed a concert there.
On 20 February 1972, English rock group Led Zeppelin held a large open-air concert at the venue as part of its Australasian Tour.
On 13 January 1973 Black Sabbath performed a concert there. 
On 17–18 February 1973, the Rolling Stones played three shows there as part of their 1973 Pacific Tour.
On 16 February 1985, Greek singers George Dalaras & Dimitra Galani with their band, performed a concert there.
In February 1986, Bob Dylan performed three concerts there.
In November 1987, David Bowie performed four concerts at the venue.

Notable members

Eva de Jong-Duldig, Wimbledon player, has been a member of the club for over half a century.

See also
 List of tennis stadiums by capacity
 List of tennis venues

References

External links

Music venues in Melbourne
Sports venues in Melbourne
Tennis venues in Australia
1946 Davis Cup
1953 Davis Cup
1957 Davis Cup
1961 Davis Cup
1966 Davis Cup
1983 Davis Cup
1986 Davis Cup
Sports venues completed in 1927
1927 establishments in Australia
Sport in the City of Stonnington
Buildings and structures in the City of Stonnington